Thiago Alcântara do Nascimento (born 11 April 1991), Known as Thiago Alcântara or simply Thiago, is a professional footballer who plays as a central midfielder for Premier League club Liverpool and the Spain national team. Known for his accurate passes and technical skills, he is often regarded as one of the best midfielders of his generation.

Born in Italy to Brazilian parents, he is the eldest child of former player Mazinho. Thiago joined Barcelona aged 14, and made his first team debut in 2009. After winning honours including four La Liga titles, the UEFA Champions League and the FIFA Club World Cup for Barcelona, he was signed by Bayern Munich for €25 million in 2013. In Germany, Thiago won 16 trophies, including the Bundesliga seven times in a row, and the UEFA Champions League as part of a continental treble in his final year at the club. In 2020, he signed for Liverpool in a transfer worth an initial £20 million. With Liverpool, he won the FA Cup and EFL Cup in 2022.

After helping Spain to European Championships at under-19 and under-21 levels, he made his full international debut in 2011. Thiago was part of the provisional squad for Spain in the 2014 World Cup but withdrew due to a knee injury. He was selected for UEFA Euro 2016, the 2018 FIFA World Cup, and UEFA Euro 2020.

Club career

Early career
Thiago was born in San Pietro Vernotico, Italy, when his father Mazinho (player for the Brazilian national team from 1989 to 1994) was playing for nearby U.S. Lecce. He started at the lower levels of Flamengo in Brazil, and, at the age of five, moved to Spain with his father, and started playing with Galician team Ureca in Nigrán. In 2001, he played with Kelme CF when his father played for Elche CF. He returned to Flamengo aged 10 and, in 2005, once again moved back to Spain, signing with FC Barcelona.

Barcelona

2009–10 
On 17 May 2009, aged 18, Thiago made his debut for the first team when he came on as a substitute for Eiður Guðjohnsen in the 74th minute at RCD Mallorca for his only appearance of the season. Barcelona, having already been declared champions of La Liga for the season, lost 1–2.

On 20 February 2010, after coming on as a substitute for Yaya Touré in the 76th minute, Thiago scored his first goal for Barcelona in a 4–0 home win against Racing de Santander. He scored his third goal against Real Sociedad in a start on 29 April, although Barcelona lost 2–1.  He ended the 2010–11 season with 17 games, three goals, and three assists, and was an unused substitute as Barcelona won the 2011 UEFA Champions League Final against Manchester United at Wembley Stadium.

2011–12 
Thiago started the 2011–12 season with  the first leg of the Spanish Supercopa match against rivals Real Madrid, being substituted for Xavi after 58 minutes, and was an unused substitute as they defeated FC Porto for the 2011 UEFA Super Cup. He then scored in Barcelona's first La Liga match of the season in a 5–0 home win against Villarreal CF. On 18 December, he started as Barcelona won 4–0 in the Club World Cup Final at International Stadium Yokohama. Thiago also netted Barcelona's fifth in a 7–0 win against Rayo Vallecano on 29 April from a close-range header. He followed this a dance with Dani Alves then stopped by Carles Puyol.

Bayern Munich

2013–15: Debut season and injury

On 14 July 2013, Thiago signed a four-year deal with Bundesliga club Bayern Munich, for a €25 million fee. Bayern would pay €20 million to Barcelona directly with the remainder being covered by the proceeds of a friendly to be played between the two teams at some point in the following four years and by Thiago foregoing some money owed to him by Barcelona. The transfer came despite a new contract that Barcelona had given Thiago in 2011 which set his release clause at €90 million. Barcelona failed to fulfil clauses in the contract relating to the amount of playing time that Thiago received, and as a result his buy-out clause dropped to €18m. Guardiola had made Thiago a priority signing. Thiago made his Bayern debut in a 4–2 defeat to Borussia Dortmund in the 2013 DFL-Supercup on 27 July. He made his debut in the Bundesliga in a 0–1 win against Eintracht Frankfurt on 11 August 2013.

On 21 December 2013, he scored his first competitive goal for Bayern Munich, in the 2013 FIFA Club World Cup Final against Raja Casablanca of Morocco, sealing the 2–0 win for the German club.  On 29 January 2014, he scored his first Bundesliga goal, the scissor-kicked winner in stoppage time against VfB Stuttgart which was voted the Goal of the Month. He also had an assist to Claudio Pizarro for Bayern's first goal in the 2–1 win. Four days later, in a match against Eintracht Frankfurt, he set a Bundesliga record with 185 touches of the ball. On 23 February, in a 4–0 win over Hannover 96, Thiago scored his second and last goal of  the Bundesliga season. His season ended due to a knee ligament tear against 1899 Hoffenheim six days later, although Bayern went on to win the league and cup. He finished the season with two goals in 16 Bundesliga matches, two German Cup matches, four Champions League matches, a goal in two FIFA Club World Cup, and an appearance in the German Super Cup.

After over a year out injured, Thiago returned on 4 April 2015, replacing Philipp Lahm for the last 21 minutes of a 1–0 win at Borussia Dortmund. Four days later, he again replaced Lahm in a DFB-Pokal quarter-final at Bayer Leverkusen, scoring the winning goal in the penalty shootout after a goalless draw. On 15 April, he scored in the team's Champions League quarter-final first leg away to FC Porto, albeit in a 1–3 defeat. Six days later, he headed in Juan Bernat's cross for the opening goal of a 6–1 rout to overturn the first leg deficit against Porto, helping Bayern advance to the Champions League semi-finals. On 26 April, after VfL Wolfsburg lost to Borussia Mönchengladbach, Thiago won his second Bundesliga title for Bayern. He finished the season with two goals in 13 appearances.

2015–17: Domestic double and individual success
On 27 August 2015, Thiago signed a new four-year contract with Bayern. On 10 February 2016, he contributed a goal in 3–0 win over VfL Bochum in the DFB-Pokal quarterfinal match. He scored twice in a 5–0 home victory over Werder Bremen on 12 March. On 17 March, Thiago scored a goal in a brilliant comeback against Juventus as his side came from 2–0 down to gain a 4–2 victory in the Champions League round of sixteen tie. He finished the season with four goals and seven assists. In addition to playing in the German Super Cup, Thiago scored two goals in 27 Bundesliga matches, a goal in five German Cup matches, and a goal in nine Champions League matches.

Thiago started the 2016–17 season under new club manager Carlo Ancelotti by winning the 2016 DFL-Supercup with a 2–0 victory against his club's rival Borussia Dortmund on 15 August 2016. On 21 September, he scored his first goal of the season in a 3–0 victory over Hertha BSC. Thiago contributed one goal and one assist in a 3–0 victory over RB Leipzig and was named Man of the match on 22 December. On 16 February 2017, he scored two goals and provided one assist as Bayern defeated Arsenal with a 5–1 victory in the first leg of the Champions League round of sixteen tie. On 28 April, he signed a new four-year contract until 2021. He scored nine goals and had nine assists throughout the season.

2017–20: Consistent silverware, European treble

Because of an injury, Thiago could not play his club's first competitive match of the season, in the 2017 DFL-Supercup where Bayern won against Borussia Dortmund 5–4 on penalties on 6 August 2017. On 26 October, he scored an equalizing goal against RB Leipzig to make it 1–1 and later Bayern went on to win the DFB-Pokal second-round match 5–4 on penalties. On 23 November, he was substituted in the 44th minute of the match as he suffered a serious muscle injury in his thigh in Bayern's 2–1 away victory over R.S.C. Anderlecht in the Champions League group stage match and was confirmed by his club manager Jupp Heynckes that he will be out for a long period of time. Thiago was back in the starting lineup and made his first appearance since his injury in November in a 2–1 away victory over VfL Wolfsburg on 17 February 2018. On 4 April, he scored a header which secured Bayern Munich a 2–1 away victory over Sevilla FC in the first leg of their Champions League quarter-final tie. He finished the season with seven goals in 31 appearances.

On 12 August 2018, Thiago played the first competitive match of the season under the new club manager Niko Kovač and also scored a goal in a 5–0 victory over Eintracht Frankfurt as Bayern won the 2018 DFL-Supercup. On 18 May 2019, Thiago won his sixth consecutive Bundesliga title as Bayern finished two points above Dortmund with 78 points. A week later, Thiago won his third DFB-Pokal as Bayern defeated RB Leipzig 3–0 in the 2019 DFB-Pokal Final.

Amidst heavy media speculation linking him with a potential move to Liverpool, Thiago played for Bayern in the Champions League quarter-final against his former team Barcelona, participating in an 8–2 demolition of the Catalan outfit. Thiago started for Bayern in the 2020 Champions League final against Paris Saint-Germain, playing 86 minutes before being substituted, as Bayern won their sixth Champions League, and completed a treble, having earlier clinched that season's Bundesliga and defeated Bayer Leverkusen in the DFB-Pokal final.

Liverpool

2020–2021: Impressive performances
On 18 September 2020, Premier League club Liverpool announced the signing of Thiago on a four-year contract. With the player only having a year left on his Bayern contract, Liverpool were able to purchase Thiago for just £20 million, with the potential for a further £5m in add-ons. Thiago made his debut for Liverpool on 20 September, coming off the bench at half-time as Liverpool won 2–0 against Chelsea at Stamford Bridge. With 75 successful passes, Thiago had the most passes completed by a player who played a maximum of 45 minutes in the Premier League since Opta started producing passing statistics in 2003. He has set the new record for most passes in 45 minutes as a substitute. On 29 September, Liverpool confirmed Thiago had tested positive for COVID-19.

On 17 October 2020, Thiago played his second game for Liverpool in a 2–2 away league draw against local rivals Everton. He suffered a knee injury towards the end of the game as Richarlison made a tackle that would give him a straight red card after the challenge. Thiago ended up playing the last few minutes of the game. He would not play again for several months. He returned to make a substitute appearance in Liverpool's 0–0 draw with Newcastle United on 30 December. On 8 May 2021, Thiago scored his first goal for Liverpool to seal a 2–0 home league win over Southampton.

On 24 November 2021, Thiago cut across the ball to score with a 25-yard strike (his first goal of the 2021–22 season) in a 2–0 home win for Liverpool against FC Porto in the UEFA Champions League group stage.

2022: Consistent silverware
On 27 February 2022, Thiago won his first piece of silverware with Liverpool in a 11–10 victory on penalties over Chelsea in the 2021–22 EFL Cup final after the game was still 0–0 at extra time. Thiago was due to start the final, but he sustained an injury in the warm-up and was replaced by Naby Keïta. Thiago did not make a single appearance in the cup run.

On 14 May 2022, Thiago started for Liverpool in the 2022 FA Cup Final, winning over Chelsea in a 6–5 victory on penalties after the game ended 0–0 in extra time. Thiago scored his penalty, sending it past Chelsea goalkeeper Edouard Mendy, which in turn gave Thiago his second trophy since joining Liverpool. On 17 May 2022, Thiago was named Liverpool's player of the month for April 2022.

On 30 July 2022, Thiago was part of the squad which won the FA Community Shield.

International career
As he is Brazilian, was born in Italy and grew up in Spain, Thiago was eligible to represent Brazil, Italy and Spain, ultimately choosing the latter.

Youth

He participated in the 2008 UEFA European Under-17 Championship with Spain, helping his country to eventual victory in the tournament, and scoring in the final. Thiago was ever-present during Spain's victorious 2011 UEFA European Under-21 Championship campaign, scoring the second goal of a 2–0 victory with a 40-yard free kick in the final against Switzerland. He was awarded the man of the match of the final.

On 18 June 2013, he scored a hat-trick in the 2013 UEFA European Under-21 Championship Final as Spain defeated Italy 4–2 to win their fourth title.

Senior

He made his first appearance for Spain's senior squad in a friendly against Italy on 10 August 2011, while his first competitive match was on 6 September 2011, in a Euro 2012 qualifying match 6–0 win against Liechtenstein.
Due to injury he missed Euro 2012 and the 2012 Summer Olympics in London.

Thiago was named in Spain's 30-man provisional squad for the 2014 World Cup on 13 May of that year. However, two days later, he withdrew from the squad due to a knee ligament injury obtained while playing for Bayern in March. Bayern Chief Executive Karl-Heinz Rummenigge said, "A young man who wanted to come back at the World Cup, and suddenly his dreams are burst. We will take care of him now and make sure he is fit at the start of the season."

On 2 October 2015, with the team's place in the tournament already assured, Thiago was re-called by manager Vicente del Bosque for the first time since his injury, and ten days later featured in their 1–0 UEFA Euro 2016 qualifying win away to Ukraine. On 6 October 2017, he scored his first goal for his national team in the 26th minute against Albania in a World Cup qualifier. Álvaro Odriozola sent in a cross from the right side of the box and Thiago directed the ball into the bottom corner from close range with his head.

In May 2018, he was named in Spain's 24-men squad for the warm up matches for 2018 FIFA World Cup in Russia. Thiago was selected in the final 23-man squad for the 2018 World Cup. Thiago appeared in two matches, against Portugal and Morocco. In May 2021, Thiago was included in the 24-man squad for UEFA Euro 2020. He was not included in the squad for the 2022 FIFA World Cup.

Style of play

Thiago is a highly creative and technically gifted playmaker, with excellent dribbling skills and ball control, which allows him to operate effectively in a deep-seated playmaking role as a central midfielder, although he is also capable of playing in a more advanced role as an attacking midfielder. Called "an extraordinary player" by Xavi in 2013, Thiago has been noted for his accurate distribution of the ball, as he possesses great passing technique and vision, and maintained a 90.2% pass success rate throughout the 2016–17 Bundesliga season, higher than any other player in Germany. Despite his reputation as a world class midfielder in the media, Thiago has often struggled with injuries throughout his career.

Personal life
Thiago is the son of the Brazilian former footballer and 1994 World Cup winner Mazinho. His mother, Valéria Alcântara, was a former Brazilian volleyball player. His younger brother, Rafinha, plays for Al-Arabi SC and the Brazilian national team. Rodrigo, who also played for Spain, is a lifelong friend and not a cousin as has been erroneously reported.

On 27 June 2015, he married his girlfriend, Júlia Vigas, in a ceremony in Sant Climent de Peralta, Catalonia, Spain.

He possesses dual citizenship: Brazilian citizenship along with Spanish citizenship.

Thiago is multilingual; he is fluent in five languages: Spanish, Portuguese, Catalan, German, and English.

Career statistics

Club

International

Scores and results list Spain's goal tally first

Honours

Barcelona
La Liga: 2008–09, 2009–10, 2010–11, 2012–13
Copa del Rey: 2011–12
Supercopa de España: 2010, 2011
UEFA Champions League: 2010–11
UEFA Super Cup: 2011
FIFA Club World Cup: 2011

Bayern Munich
 Bundesliga: 2013–14, 2014–15, 2015–16, 2016–17, 2017–18, 2018–19, 2019–20
 DFB-Pokal: 2013–14, 2015–16, 2018–19, 2019–20
 DFL-Supercup: 2016, 2018
 UEFA Champions League: 2019–20
 FIFA Club World Cup: 2013

Liverpool
FA Cup: 2021–22
FA Community Shield: 2022
UEFA Champions League runner-up: 2021–22

Spain U17
UEFA European Under-17 Championship: 2008

Spain U21
UEFA European Under-21 Championship: 2011, 2013

Individual
 UEFA Team of the Year: 2020
 UEFA European Under-21 Championship Golden Player: 2013
 UEFA European Under-21 Championship Silver Boot: 2013
 UEFA European Under-21 Championship Team of the Tournament: 2013
UEFA European Under-21 Championship Team of the Tournament: 2011
 Goal of the Month in Germany: January 2014
 FIFA FIFPro World11: 2020
 Bundesliga Team of the Season: 2016–17
 kicker Bundesliga Team of the Season: 2018–19
 ESM Team of the Season: 2016–17
 UEFA Champions League Squad of the Season: 2019–20
 IFFHS Men's World Team: 2020
PFA Premier League Team of the Year: 2021–22

See also
List of Spain international footballers born outside Spain

References

External links

 
 Profile at the Liverpool F.C. website
 
 National team data at BDFutbol
 
 

1991 births
Living people
Sportspeople from the Province of Brindisi
Footballers from Apulia
Spanish footballers
Association football midfielders
FC Barcelona Atlètic players
FC Barcelona players
FC Bayern Munich footballers
Liverpool F.C. players
Tercera División players
Segunda División B players
Segunda División players
La Liga players
Bundesliga players
Premier League players
UEFA Champions League winning players
Spain youth international footballers
Spain under-21 international footballers
Spain international footballers
UEFA Euro 2016 players
2018 FIFA World Cup players
UEFA Euro 2020 players
Spanish expatriate footballers
Spanish expatriate sportspeople in Germany
Spanish expatriate sportspeople in England
Expatriate footballers in Germany
Expatriate footballers in England
Brazilian emigrants to Spain
Naturalised citizens of Spain
FA Cup Final players